USS LSM-60 was a World War II era landing ship, medium (LSM) amphibious assault ship of the United States Navy.  It was notable for being used as the float to suspend a fission bomb underwater during the Operation Crossroads BAKER test, becoming the first naval vessel to deploy a nuclear weapon.

World War II Service 

LSM-60'''s keel was laid on 7 July 1944 and she was launched on 29 July. She was commissioned on 25 August, LT. William W. Doar, USNR, commanding.LSM-60 participated in the assault landings at Iwo Jima, where she earned one battle star.

 Operation Crossroads "ground" zero 

In 1946, the United States conducted the first nuclear weapon tests designed to measure nuclear explosion effects on ships, Operation Crossroads.  The second shot of this test, BAKER, was designed to test the effects of an underwater nuclear blast on surface ships and submarines.LSM-60 was modified with a well through the cargo deck and hull, a derrick to lower the bomb through the well, and a large antenna to receive the detonation signal.  On 25 July, a standard Mk. 3A "Fat Man" type atomic bomb, nicknamed Helen of Bikini, placed in a watertight casing, was suspended 90 feet below LSM-60 in the lagoon of Bikini Atoll in the Marshall Islands. At 0835 local time the bomb was detonated, destroying LSM-60 and eight target ships, including . A seaman present claimed that "there was not one identifiable piece of the LSM-60 ever located", however a British naval constructor present reports he saw a  square piece of LSM-60'' on the deck of a target ship afterward.

External links

References 

World War II amphibious warfare vessels of the United States
Ships built in Houston
LSM-1-class landing ships medium
1944 ships
Ships sunk as targets
Ships involved in Operation Crossroads
Maritime incidents in 1946